A Homemade Holiday is a Christmas EP by The Verve Pipe, released in 2007.

Track listing

Personnel 

 Brian Vander Ark – lead vocals, guitar
 Dan Matheny – guitars
 Doug Corella – keyboards, percussion
 Donny Brown – drums, background vocals
 Joel Ferguson – bass
 Jake Bartlett – drums on This Christmas Time

2007 EPs
2007 Christmas albums
The Verve Pipe albums
Christmas albums by American artists
Christmas EPs
Rock Christmas albums